The Stone County Courthouse is located at Courthouse Square in the center of Mountain View, the county seat of Stone County, Arkansas.  It is a -story stone structure, built out of native stone, with a hip roof that has exposed rafter ends.  The building has a central section with flanking wings that project slightly, with the entrance at the center, sheltered by a portico with a hip roof, dentillated cornice, and square stone posts.  The courthouse was built in 1922 to a design by Clyde A. Ferrell.

The building was listed on the National Register of Historic Places in 1976.

See also

National Register of Historic Places listings in Stone County, Arkansas

References

Courthouses on the National Register of Historic Places in Arkansas
Government buildings completed in 1922
Buildings and structures in Mountain View, Arkansas
National Register of Historic Places in Stone County, Arkansas
Stone